Tantilla may refer to:

Tantilla, a genus of snakes
Tantilla (album), a 1989 album by the House of Freaks
Tantilla, a brand name of front-action switchblade knife made by Pro-Tech Knives